Barbora Krejčíková and Kateřina Siniaková were the defending champions, having won the event in 2013, however both players chose not to participate. İpek Soylu and Jil Teichmann won the tournament by defeating Vera Lapko and Tereza Mihalíková in the final.

Seeds

Draw

Finals

Top half

Bottom half

External links 
 Draw

Girls' Doubles
US Open, 2014 Girls' Doubles